The 29th National Film Awards, presented by Directorate of Film Festivals, the organisation set up by Ministry of Information and Broadcasting, India to felicitate the best of Indian Cinema released in the year 1981. Ceremony took place in April 1982.

With 29th National Film Awards, new category for books on Indian cinema was introduced. The awards aim at the encouraging the study and appreciation of cinema as an art form and dissemination of information and critical appreciation of this art-form through publication of books, articles reviews etc.

Juries 

Three different committees were formed for feature films, short films and books on cinema, headed by veteran actor Ashok Kumar, Vasant Joglekar and Asok Mitra respectively.

 Jury Members: Feature Films
 Ashok Kumar (Chairperson)B. A. ArasukumarLeela ChitnisB. R. ChopraSalil ChowdhurySuresh KathuriaYamini KrishnamurthyR. LakshmanDnyaneshwar KulkarniBhabendra Nath SaikiaM. ShamimSundari K. ShridharaniS. G. VasudevInturi Venkateswara Rao
 Jury Members: Short Films
 Vasant Joglekar (Chairperson)Harisadhan DasguptaJagat MurariRamesh Sharma
 Jury Members: Books on Cinema
 Asok Mitra (Chairperson)P. V. AkilandanChidananda DasguptaSunil GangopadhyayPritish NandyP. PadmarajanNa. ParthasarathyM. T. Vasudevan Nair

Awards 

Awards were divided into feature films, non-feature films and books written on Indian cinema.

Lifetime Achievement Award

Feature films 

Feature films were awarded at All India as well as regional level. For 29th National Film Awards, a Bengali film, Dakhal won the National Film Award for Best Feature Film whereas a Hindi film, Umrao Jaan won the maximum number of awards (four). In the honour of veteran actress Nargis Dutt who died in 1981, award for best feature film on national integration was renamed as Nargis Dutt Award for Best Feature Film on National Integration. Following were the awards given in each category:

All India Award 

Following were the awards given:

Regional Award 

The awards were given to the best films made in the regional languages of India. For feature films in Assamese, Gujarati, Kashmiri and Punjabi language, award for Best Feature Film was not given.

Non-Feature films 

Following were the awards given:

Best Writing on Cinema 

With 29th National Film Awards, new category for books on Indian cinema was introduced. The awards aim at the encouraging the study and appreciation of cinema as an art form and dissemination of information and critical appreciation of this art-form through publication of books, articles reviews etc. Following were the awards given:

Awards not given 

Following were the awards not given as no film was found to be suitable for the award:

 Best Children's Film
 Best Film on Family Welfare
 Best Lyrics
 Best Popular Film Providing Wholesome Entertainment
 Best Film on Social Documentation
 Best Experimental Film
 Best Newsreel Cameraman
 Best Feature Film in Assamese
 Best Feature Film in Punjabi

References

External links
 National Film Awards Archives
 Official Page for Directorate of Film Festivals, India

National Film Awards (India) ceremonies
1982 Indian film awards